Louis Lang (29 February 1812 – 6 May 1893) was a German-American painter.

Biography
He was born as Joseph Aloysius Lang in Waldsee, Duchy of Württemberg. His father, a historical painter, wished him to become a musician, but his taste was for art. At the age of 16, he executed pastels with success. He studied at Stuttgart and Paris, and settled in the United States in 1838, his studio being for several years in Philadelphia. He spent the years 1841 to 1845 in Italy, and moved to New York City in 1845, where he resided, with frequent visits to Europe. He was elected a National Academician in 1852, and was a member of the Artists' Fund Society.

Works
Lang's style was characterized by brilliant but well-balanced coloring. Among his works are:

 "Maid of Saragossa"
 "Mary Stuart distributing Gifts"
 "Blind Nydia"
 "Jephtha's Daughter"
 "Neapolitan Fisher Family"
 "Mary, Queen of Scots"
 "Cinderella"
 "Return of the 69th (Irish) Regiment"
 "Asleep in Prayer" (1869)
 "Little Graziosa among the Butterflies" (1871)
 "Landing of the Market-Boat at Capri" (1876)
 "Romeo and Juliet" (Century Club, New York)
 "Portrait of a Little Child" (1885)

Gallery

Notes

References
 This source reports his birth date as February 29, 1812.

External links
  (portrait)

1812 births
1893 deaths
People from Bad Waldsee
People from the Kingdom of Württemberg
German emigrants to the United States
19th-century American painters
19th-century American male artists
American male painters
Painters from New York City